Ricardio Morris (born 24 April 1993) is a Barbadian international footballer who plays for Tulsa Athletic, as a defender.

Career
Morris has played club football for Barbados Defence Force and Tulsa Athletic, and made his international debut for Barbados in 2012.

References

1993 births
Living people
Barbadian footballers
Barbados international footballers
Barbados Defence Force SC players
Tulsa Athletic players
Association football defenders
Barbadian expatriate footballers
Barbadian expatriate sportspeople in the United States
Expatriate soccer players in the United States